Sharone Vernon-Evans (born 28 August 1998) is a Canadian volleyball player. He is a member of the Canada men's national volleyball team and Japanese club Osaka Blazers Sakai.

Personal life
Vernon-Evans started playing volleyball at a young age in his hometown of Scarborough, Ontario and attended Agincourt Collegiate Institute. He initially wanted to play basketball but switched to volleyball after his school's basketball team folded. He played club volleyball for the Pakmen Volleyball Club, winning multiple provincial championships and national medals. At the Team Canada tryouts, Vernon-Evans set a national record, touching 12'6.5" in the spike touch test

Career
Vernon-Evans began his post high-school volleyball career with the Team Canada FTC in Gatineau. In 2017, he signed with PlusLiga club ONICO Warszawa, joining up with national team head coach Stephane Antiga.

National team
Vernon-Evans first joined the national team volleyball program in 2016 with the Canada men's junior national volleyball team. With the junior national team, he helped them to a bronze medal finish at the 2016 Men's Junior NORCECA Volleyball Championship and the 2017 Men's Junior Pan-American Volleyball Cup. In May 2017, he was announced to be a member of the Senior National Team's roster for the 2017 FIVB Volleyball World League. He helped the team to a team best finish of 3rd place in World League. Few months later Vernon-Evans was named the Best Opposite Spiker at the 2017 Norceca Championship, helping the team win bronze along the way. In June 2021, Vernon-Evans was named to Canada's 2020 Olympic team.

Sporting achievements

National team
 2016  Junior NORCECA Championship
 2017  Junior Pan-Am Cup
 2017  FIVB World League
 2017  NORCECA Championship

Individual
 2017 NORCECA Championship - Best Opposite Spiker

References

External links
 
 

1998 births
Living people
Canadian men's volleyball players
Volleyball players from Toronto
Sportspeople from Scarborough, Toronto
Volleyball players at the 2020 Summer Olympics
Olympic volleyball players of Canada
Canadian expatriate sportspeople in Poland
Expatriate volleyball players in Poland
Projekt Warsaw players
Opposite hitters